Aston Eyre is a civil parish in Shropshire, England.  It contains eight listed buildings that are recorded in the National Heritage List for England.  Of these, three are listed at Grade II*, the middle of the three grades, and the others are at Grade II, the lowest grade.  The parish contains the small village of Aston Eyre but is otherwise rural.  Most of the listed buildings are farmhouses and farm buildings, the others being a church and a bridge.


Key

Buildings

References

Citations

Sources

Lists of buildings and structures in Shropshire